Queen Kham-Oun I (15 July 1885 – 5 June 1915), was queen consort of Laos from 1904 to 1915 by marriage to king Sisavang Vong. She was the mother of Sisavang Vatthana. She died at the Royal Palace, Luang Prabang.

References

Laotian royalty
1885 births
1915 deaths
19th-century Laotian women
20th-century Laotian women